The Right Reverend John Franklin Meldon Hine (born 26 July 1938) is a Roman Catholic bishop in England. He was an auxiliary bishop of the Archdiocese of Southwark from February 2001 until his retirement in May 2016, and holds the titular see of Beverley.

Early life
John Franklin Meldon Hine was born in Tunbridge Wells, part of the Southwark Archdiocese, on 26 July 1938. He is the son of Lieutenant Commander Jack F. W. Hine (RN) and Moira E. Hine. He was educated by the Jesuits at Stonyhurst College and the Xaverian Brothers at Mayfield College.

After studying at the Venerable English College, Rome, Hine was ordained as a Catholic priest, on 28 October 1962 for the Archdiocese of Southwark. He served as Vicar General and Chancellor of the Archdiocese before his elevation to the episcopate, and was a Canon of the Cathedral of St George, Southwark and a Monsignor.

Episcopal career
On 26 January 2001, the then Pope John Paul II, on the recommendation of the Apostolic Nuncio and the then Archbishop of Southwark, Michael Bowen, appointed Father Hine as an auxiliary bishop of Southwark. He was consecrated by Archbishop Bowen on 27 February 2001, with Bishops Christopher Budd and Crispian Hollis as co consecrators, and assigned the titular see of Beverley. Archbishop Bowen gave him oversight of the Kent Pastoral Area of the Archdiocese, which comprises the deaneries of Canterbury, Chatham, Dover, Gravesend, Maidstone, Thanet and Bishop Hine's home area of Tunbridge Wells.

Hine was the most senior of the three auxiliaries in Southwark, having been appointed five years before Bishops Hendricks & Lynch. As such, he deputised for the Archbishop at a number of diocesan events, such as the 2008 Chrism Mass, during Archbishop Kevin McDonald's convalescence from a heart bypass operation, as well as continuing to oversee his own geographical patch in Kent. He was elected as Diocesan Administrator following Archbishop McDonald's resignation, serving from December 2009 to June 2010, when Archbishop Peter Smith was installed as archbishop.

In accordance with Canon Law, upon reaching the age of 75, Hine submitted his resignation from office to Pope Francis. In January 2014 he relinquished his geographical responsibilities for the Kent area of the Archdiocese of Southwark, and was appointed parish priest of St Andrew's, Tenterden.  He retired as auxiliary bishop on 7 May 2016.

References

Sources
 Biodata from Southwark Diocese website

20th-century Roman Catholic bishops in England
21st-century Roman Catholic bishops in England
1938 births
Living people
People from Royal Tunbridge Wells
People educated at Stonyhurst College
British Roman Catholics
Roman Catholic bishops of Beverley
English College, Rome alumni